Khan A Sabur or Abdus Sabur Khan (10 October 190825 January 1982) was a Bangladeshi politician and lawyer from Khulna. He served as a minister in the government of Ayub Khan. During the Bangladesh Liberation War, Khan stood in favor of Pakistan and later listed as a Razakar from Khulna according to the released list of Bangladesh government.  He was also a key perpetrator in the 1964 East Pakistan riots.

Early life 
Khan was born on 10 October 1908 in Khulna, British Raj. Nazmul Hossain Khan a lawyer was his father. He studied in Khulna Zilla School and Calcutta City College.

Career 
Khan joined the Krishak Praja Party in 1937. He later joined the Bengal Provincial Muslim League went on to become its joint secretary in 1938. As a candidate from the Muslim League he was elected to Bengal Legislative Assembly. He was elected to Pakistan National Assembly in 1962. He was the minister of Communication in the Ayub Khan's cabinet. He was later a member of the Muslim League (Qayyum) and contested in the 1970 Pakistani general election. During the Bangladesh Liberation War he sided with the Pakistan Army against Bangladeshi independence. He was arrested in 1972 after Bangladesh was liberated. However he was later released because of a general amnesty under the Collaborators Act 1972. In 1976, he established the Bangladesh Muslim League and was elected to parliament in 1979 from three constituencies in Khulna.

Death
Khan died on 25 January 1982. He remained a bachelor his whole life and donated all his property to a public welfare trust.

References

1908 births
1982 deaths
People from Khulna
Krishak Sramik Party politicians
Pakistani MNAs 1962–1965